= Hippucome =

Town of ancient Lycia

Coordinates: 36°50′01″N 29°01′37″E

Hippucome or Hippoukome (Ancient Greek: Ἵππουκώμη) was a town of ancient Lycia.

Its site is located near İtasar, Asiatic Turkey.
